Ingeborg Rasmussen (born July 5, 1960) is a Norwegian sprint canoer who competed from the mid-1980s to the early 1990s. Competing in two Summer Olympics, she earned her best finish of sixth in the K-4 500 m event at Los Angeles in 1984.

References
Sports-Reference.com profile

1960 births
Canoeists at the 1984 Summer Olympics
Canoeists at the 1992 Summer Olympics
Living people
Norwegian female canoeists
Olympic canoeists of Norway